Thomas Oppenheimer (born December 16, 1988) is a German professional ice hockey forward who is currently an unrestricted free agent. He previously played under contract with Eisbären Berlin of the Deutsche Eishockey Liga (DEL).

Playing career 
A native of Toledo, Ohio, Oppenheimer made his debut in Germany's top-tier Deutsche Eishockey Liga (DEL) in the course of the 2006-07 season. In 2010, he left the Frankfurt Lions to join fellow DEL side Hamburg Freezers and developed into an integral part of the side over the years. In 2015-16, which turned out to be the last season of the Hamburg team, he scored 21 goals in 52 regular season contests along with 13 assists, while serving as an assistant captain.

With the announcement of the Hamburg Freezers ceasing operations and folding in May 2016. A couple of days later, Oppenheimer signed a five-year deal with another DEL club, ERC Ingolstadt, on June 1, 2016. On June 6, 2017, he was traded to fellow DEL team Eisbären Berlin.

International play
Oppenheimer represented the German men's national team at the 2014 and 2015 World Championships.

Career statistics

Regular season and playoffs

International

References

External links

1988 births
Living people
Eisbären Berlin players
EC Peiting players
ERC Ingolstadt players
Frankfurt Lions players
German ice hockey forwards
Hamburg Freezers players
SC Riessersee players
People from Weilheim-Schongau
Sportspeople from Upper Bavaria